Dudley Francis Stuart Ryder, 3rd Earl of Harrowby  (16 January 183126 March 1900), known as Viscount Sandon from 1847 to 1882, was a British peer and politician.

Life
He was the second son and eventual heir of Dudley Ryder, 2nd Earl of Harrowby, and Lady Frances Stuart, fourth daughter of John Stuart, 1st Marquess of Bute.
He was born at Brighton on 16 January 1831. 
He was educated at Harrow and the university of Oxford, where he matriculated from Christ Church on 31 May 1849, graduated B.A. in 1853, and proceeded M.A. in 1878.

On leaving the university, Viscount Sandon, as he was styled during his father's lifetime, made a tour in the East with Henry Herbert, 4th Earl of Carnarvon, visiting Syria and the Lebanon (see Carnavon's Recollections of the Druses of the Lebanon, London, 1860, 8vo). 
On his return to England, he did garrison duty as captain in the 2nd Staffordshire militia regiment, during the Crimean war and Indian mutiny.

Political career

Harrowby was Member of Parliament (MP) for Lichfield from 1856 to 1859 and for Liverpool from 1868 until he succeeded to the peerage in 1882.  
He gained experience of affairs as private secretary to Henry Labouchere at the colonial office.

He was a member of the select committees on the Hudson's Bay Company (1857) and the Euphrates Valley (1871–72), and continued throughout life to devote much time and attention to the study of imperial and colonial questions. 
He was Vice-President of the Committee on Education from 1874 to 1878, and President of the Board of Trade (with a seat in the cabinet) from 1878 to 1880 in Benjamin Disraeli's second administration and was sworn of the Privy Council in 1874.  
Between 1885 and 1886, he served as Lord Privy Seal in Lord Salisbury's first government.

Apart from his career in national politics he was also Chairman of the Staffordshire county council and a Deputy Lieutenant and Justice of the Peace for that county.

He died at Sandon Hall, Staffordshire, on 26 March 1900.

Family
Lord Harrowby married Lady Mary Cecil, daughter of Brownlow Cecil, 2nd Marquess of Exeter, in 1861. The marriage was childless. Harrowby died in March 1900, aged 69, and was succeeded by his younger brother, Henry. 
Lady Harrowby died in July 1917.

References

External links
 

1831 births
1900 deaths
Lords Privy Seal
People educated at Harrow School
Alumni of Christ Church, Oxford
Members of the Privy Council of the United Kingdom
Earls of Harrowby
English justices of the peace
Members of the Parliament of the United Kingdom for Liverpool
UK MPs 1852–1857
UK MPs 1857–1859
UK MPs 1868–1874
UK MPs 1874–1880
UK MPs 1880–1885
Harrowby, E3
Members of the London School Board
Dudley
Deputy Lieutenants of Staffordshire
Presidents of the Board of Trade